Heterodon is a genus of harmless colubrid snakes endemic to  North America. They are stout with upturned snouts and are perhaps best known for their characteristic threat displays. Three species are currently recognized. Members of the genus are commonly known as hognose snakes, hog-nosed snakes, North American hog-nosed snakes, and colloquially as puff adders (though they should not be confused with the venomous African vipers of the genus Bitis).

Description

The body is stout and the head is slightly distinct from the neck. The latter is expandable, the anterior ribs being capable of spreading to flatten that portion of the body, similar to a cobra. The tail is short and the anal scale divided. The dorsal scales are keeled with apical pits in 23-25 rows. The rostral scale is projecting, upturned, recurved and keeled dorsally. There are usually 1-20 accessory scales (azygous) that separate the internasals and the prefrontals. A subocular ring is present with 8-12 ocular scales. There are 7-8 upper labials and 9-13 lower labials. The ventrals number 114-152 and the subcaudals 27-60.

The color pattern is extremely variable. H. nasicus tends to be sandy-colored with black and white markings, while H. platirhinos varies from reds, greens, oranges, browns, to black depending on locality. They are sometimes blotched and sometimes solid-colored.

Members of this genus have enlarged rear maxillary teeth, two on each side, and possess a slightly toxic saliva. In a few cases involving bites from H. nasicus, the symptoms reported have ranged from none at all to mild tingling, swelling and itchy skin. Nevertheless, they are generally considered to be very harmless to humans.

Hognose snakes' most distinguishing characteristic is their upturned snout, which is believed to aid in digging in sandy soils.

Behavior
When threatened, the hognose snake will flatten its neck and raise its head off the ground, similar to a cobra, and hiss. It may sometimes feign strikes, but is extremely reluctant to bite. This behavior has earned the hognose snake several nicknames, such as "blowing adder", "flathead", "spreading adder", or "hissing adder". If this threat display does not work to deter a would-be predator, the hognose snake will often roll onto its back and play dead with its mouth open and tongue lolling, going as far as to emit a foul musk from the cloaca. Emission of cloacal musk is considerably less likely than in many other species. If the snake is rolled upright while in this state, it will often roll over again as if to insist that it is really dead.

Unfortunately due to their appearance and impressive defensive display, hognose snakes are commonly mistaken to be copperheads and subsequently killed. This is especially true in the southeastern regions of the United States, where copperheads are especially prevalent by comparison to other areas it shares with the hognose.

Feeding
The bulk of the Heterodon species diet is made up of rodents and lizards. H. platirhinos  is an exception, and specializes in feeding on toads, having an immunity to the toxins that toads secrete.

Captivity
Hognose snakes are frequently found in the exotic pet trade. H. nasicus are often considered to be the easiest to care for, and captive-bred stock is easily found. H. platirhinos  is commonly found, but their dietary requirements can be a challenge for some keepers.

Species

* Not including the nominate subspecies

References

External links

Further reading
Goin, Coleman J.; Olive B. Goin; George R. Zug. (1978). Introduction to Herpetology, Third Edition. San Francisco: W.H. Freeman. xi + 378 pp. . (Heterodon, pp. 149, 167, 328-329.)
Latreille, P.A. In Sonnini, C.S. and P.A. Latreille. (1801). Histoire naturelle des reptiles, avec figures dessinées d'apres nature; Tome IV. Seconde Partie. Serpens. Paris: Crapelet. 410 pp. (Genus Heterodon, p. 32.)
Schmidt, K.P., and D.D. Davis. 1941. Field Book of Snakes of the United States and Canada. G.P. Putnam's Sons. New York. 365 pp. ("THE HOG-NOSED SNAKES (Heterodon)", pp. 115–118, Figures 25. & 26. + Plate 11 on p. 331.)
Zim, H.S., and H.M. Smith. 1956. Reptiles and Amphibians: A Guide to Familiar Species. A Golden Nature Guide. Simon and Schuster. New York. 160 pp. ("HOG-NOSED SNAKE", "Heterodon nasicus and H. platyrhinos [sic]", pp. 81, 156.)

Heterodon
Snake genera
Taxa named by Pierre André Latreille